The 2015 Men's European Volleyball Championship was the 29th edition of the Men's European Volleyball Championship, organised by Europe's governing volleyball body, the CEV. It was held in Bulgaria and Italy from 9 to 18 October 2015. For the first time the competition had an official song; "Heroes" featuring vocals by Niki Bakalov.

France won their first title in the tournament by defeating Slovenia, which went to the final for the first time, in straight sets. Antonin Rouzier was elected the Most Valuable Player.

Qualification

Hosts

Top 5 teams of the 2013 edition directly qualified.

Qualified through the qualification.

Pools composition
The drawing of lots was held in Sofia, Bulgaria on 16 February 2015. First, the hosts and the team which was chosen by the hosts were seeded at the top of each pool. Then the next 4 teams which ranked highest in the previous edition were drawn. Finally, the other teams were drawn. Numbers in brackets denote the European ranking as of 25 September 2015.

Squads

Venues

Pool standing procedure
 Number of matches won
 Match points
 Sets ratio
 Points ratio
 Result of the last match between the tied teams

Match won 3–0 or 3–1: 3 match points for the winner, 0 match points for the loser
Match won 3–2: 2 match points for the winner, 1 match point for the loser

Preliminary round
All times in Bulgaria are Eastern European Summer Time (UTC+03:00) and all times in Italy are Central European Summer Time (UTC+02:00).

Pool A

Pool B

Pool C

Pool D

Final round
All times in Bulgaria are Eastern European Summer Time (UTC+03:00) and all times in Italy are Central European Summer Time (UTC+02:00).

Playoffs

Quarterfinals

Semifinals

3rd place match

Final

Final standing

Awards

Most Valuable Player
  Antonin Rouzier
Best Setter
  Simone Giannelli
Best Outside Spikers
  Tine Urnaut
  Earvin N'Gapeth
Best Middle Blockers
  Teodor Todorov
  Viktor Yosifov
Best Opposite Spiker
  Ivan Zaytsev
Best Libero
  Jenia Grebennikov
Fair Play Award
  Vladimir Nikolov

References

External links
Official website
Organizer website
Regulations

2015
2015 Men's European Volleyball Championship
2015 Men's European Volleyball Championship
Men's European Volleyball Championship
Men's European Volleyball Championship
European Volleyball Championship
Men's European Volleyball Championship
Busto Arsizio
2010s in Turin
Sports competitions in Sofia
Sports competitions in Turin
2010s in Sofia